The arrondissement of Boulogne-sur-Mer is an arrondissement of France in the Pas-de-Calais department in the Hauts-de-France region. It has 74 communes.

Composition

The communes of the arrondissement of Boulogne-sur-Mer, and their INSEE codes, are:

 Alincthun (62022)
 Ambleteuse (62025)
 Audembert (62052)
 Audinghen (62054)
 Audresselles (62056)
 Baincthun (62075)
 Bazinghen (62089)
 Bellebrune (62104)
 Belle-et-Houllefort (62105)
 Beuvrequen (62125)
 Boulogne-sur-Mer (62160)
 Bournonville (62165)
 Brunembert (62179)
 Carly (62214)
 Colembert (62230)
 Condette (62235)
 Conteville-lès-Boulogne (62237)
 Courset (62251)
 Crémarest (62255)
 Dannes (62264)
 Desvres (62268)
 Doudeauville (62273)
 Echinghen (62281)
 Équihen-Plage (62300)
 Ferques (62329)
 Halinghen (62402)
 Henneveux (62429)
 Hervelinghen (62444)
 Hesdigneul-lès-Boulogne (62446)
 Hesdin-l'Abbé (62448)
 Isques (62474)
 La Capelle-lès-Boulogne (62908)
 Lacres (62483)
 Landrethun-le-Nord (62487)
 Le Portel (62667)
 Le Wast (62880)
 Leubringhen (62503)
 Leulinghen-Bernes (62505)
 Longfossé (62524)
 Longueville (62526)
 Lottinghen (62530)
 Maninghen-Henne (62546)
 Marquise (62560)
 Menneville (62566)
 Nabringhen (62599)
 Nesles (62603)
 Neufchâtel-Hardelot (62604)
 Offrethun (62636)
 Outreau (62643)
 Pernes-lès-Boulogne (62653)
 Pittefaux (62658)
 Quesques (62678)
 Questrecques (62679)
 Rety (62705)
 Rinxent (62711)
 Saint-Étienne-au-Mont (62746)
 Saint-Inglevert (62751)
 Saint-Léonard (62755)
 Saint-Martin-Boulogne (62758)
 Saint-Martin-Choquel (62759)
 Samer (62773)
 Selles (62786)
 Senlecques (62789)
 Tardinghen (62806)
 Tingry (62821)
 Verlincthun (62845)
 Vieil-Moutier (62853)
 Wacquinghen (62867)
 Wierre-au-Bois (62888)
 Wierre-Effroy (62889)
 Wimereux (62893)
 Wimille (62894)
 Wirwignes (62896)
 Wissant (62899)

History

The arrondissement of Boulogne-sur-Mer was created in 1800. The arrondissement of Calais was created in 1962 from part of the arrondissement of Boulogne-sur-Mer. At the January 2017 reorganisation of the arrondissements of Pas-de-Calais, it lost one commune to the arrondissement of Calais.

As a result of the reorganisation of the cantons of France which came into effect in 2015, the borders of the cantons are no longer related to the borders of the arrondissements. The cantons of the arrondissement of Boulogne-sur-Mer were, as of January 2015:

 Boulogne-sur-Mer-Nord-Est
 Boulogne-sur-Mer-Nord-Ouest
 Boulogne-sur-Mer-Sud
 Desvres
 Marquise
 Outreau
 Le Portel
 Samer

Sub-prefects 
 Joseph Masclet (14 Floréal an VIII, 4 May 1800)
 Antoine Pugliesi-Conti (1866)
 Charles Lutaud (10 April 1884)

References

Boulogne-sur-Mer